Castle Doombad is an iOS and Android video game developed by Grumpyface Studios and published by Adult Swim Games on January 9, 2014. It was followed up by Castle Doombad: Free to Slay, which was released on July 17, 2014. The game went on to receive numerous "Best of 2014" awards including Metacritic's "25 Best Reviewed iOS games of 2014", and selected as one of Apple's "Best Apps of 2014".

Gameplay
The player take on the role of Dr. Lord Evilstein who has just kidnapped a local princess.  The player must construct traps and defenses to defeat waves of heroes who are attempting to save the princess.  Available traps include minions who will attack the heroes, automatic traps such as trap doors, and manual traps such as spikes.

Critical reception

The game received "generally favorable reviews", just two points shy of "universal acclaim", according to the review aggregation website Metacritic.

References

External links
 

2014 video games
Adult Swim games
Android (operating system) games
Grumpyface Studios games
IOS games
Side-scrolling video games
Single-player video games
Tower defense video games
Video games developed in the United States
Video games set in castles